Taxi!!! is a 1978 American made-for-television drama film starring Martin Sheen and Eva Marie Saint. Directed by Joseph Hardy, it debuted on the NBC television network as a Hallmark Hall of Fame presentation on February 2, 1978.

Plot
A conversation develops between a down-to-earth taxi driver (Martin Sheen) and his passenger, a wealthy and restless matron (Eva Marie Saint) that forever changes their lives during a ride from a midtown Manhattan hotel to John F. Kennedy International Airport.

Cast
 Martin Sheen as the Taxi Driver
 Eva Marie Saint as the Passenger

External links
 

1978 drama films
1978 television films
1978 films
Hallmark Hall of Fame episodes
Films set in New York City
Films directed by Joseph Hardy (director)